The Corus Trojan is a type of heavy shunting industrial diesel locomotive designed and manufactured by Corus Northern Engineering Services in Scunthorpe, UK in 2007-9, and re-manufactured by the Hunslet Engine Company from 2011 due to design flaws.

History and design
In February 2007 Corus announced that it was to build four 100 tonne,  4 axle locomotives; the locomotives were to be constructed by Corus Northern Engineering Services at their workshop at the Scunthorpe Steelworks in Lincolnshire, UK; the locomotive design was carried out by Railcraft Associates (Doncaster).

The 'Trojan' range included B,C,B'B' and C'C' wheel arrangement designs, with an axleload of up to 25 tonnes, and capable of being built to track gauges between 610mm and 1676mm. The family was designed for industrial operators, and trip work.

The Port Talbot locomotive's chassis were constructed at Corus's Llanwern site, with assembly at Scunthorpe taking place during 2008. The first locomotive, number 920, went into service in late 2009. 921 and 922 were delivered in 2011.

The locomotives were found to have a number of design issues, and the fourth unit was modified by the Hunslet Engine Company. Modifications included the replacement of a ceiling-mounted driving panel to a more conventional position, replacement of the engine control electronics, and other modifications to solve a number of teething and design issues. Dynamic testing of the rebuilt locomotive took place at the Chasewater Railway, and the locomotive began in-service testing at Port Talbot steelworks in April 2012. The other 3 locomotives were also to be modified by Hunslet in 2012.

References

External links

Tata Steel Europe
Industrial diesel locomotives of Great Britain
Standard gauge locomotives of Great Britain
Railway locomotives introduced in 2009